Imre Gyöngyössy (25 February 1930 – 1 May 1994) was a Hungarian film director and screenwriter. His film The Revolt of Job (1983), which he co-directed with Barna Kabay, was nominated for the Academy Award for Best Foreign Language Film.  Gyöngyössy said that he intended the film "as a message not only between generations but between nations".

Selected filmography
 Job's Revolt (1983)
 Yerma (1984)

References

External links

Hungarian film directors
Male screenwriters
Hungarian male writers
People educated at the Benedictine High School of Pannonhalma
1930 births
1994 deaths
20th-century Hungarian screenwriters